Talis afghanella is a moth in the family Crambidae. It is found in Afghanistan.

References

Ancylolomiini
Moths described in 1965
Moths of Asia